Club Deportivo Castellón "B" is a Spanish football team, founded in 1958 and based in Castellón de la Plana, in the Valencian Community, it's the reserve team of CD Castellón.

Club background
Deportivo Castalia Club de Fútbol - (1958–68)
Club Deportivo Castellón Aficionados - (1968–80)
Club Deportivo Castellón "B" - (1980–present)

Season to season

12 seasons in Tercera División
1 season in Tercera División RFEF

Current squad

Notable former players
 Ángel Dealbert
 Manuel Arana
 Pau Franch
 José Ferrer
 César Remón

Notable former coaches
 Fernando Giner

References

External links
Official website
Pam Pam Orellut, unofficial website
Futbolme.com profile

Football clubs in the Valencian Community
 
Association football clubs established in 1958
Spanish reserve football teams
Divisiones Regionales de Fútbol clubs
1958 establishments in Spain